Wola Grabska  is a village in the administrative district of Gmina Pniewy, within Grójec County, Masovian Voivodeship, in east-central Poland.

Etymology 
Wola is a name given to agricultural villages, Grabska means "from Grab" and this probably relates to Grab, a village in Poland

References

Wola Grabska